Alfeandra Dewangga Santosa (born 28 June 2001) is an Indonesian professional footballer who plays for Liga 1 club PSIS Semarang and the Indonesia national team. His main position is a centre-back, he can also play as left-back or defensive midfielder.

Club career

PSIS Semarang
Dewangga made his first-team debut on 7 March 2020 as a substitute in a match against Persela Lamongan at the Surajaya Stadium, Lamongan. This season was suspended on 27 March 2020 due to the COVID-19 pandemic. The season was abandoned and was declared void on 20 January 2021.

Dewangga made his debut of the new league season match against Persela Lamongan on 4 September 2021 as a substitute for Muhammad Rio Saputro in the 46th minute. Dewangga scored his first league goal from a free-kick in injury time 93rd minute, against Bhayangkara on 12 March 2022. In July 2022, with a market value of 4.35 billion rupiah, he became the most expensive local player in PSIS Semarang.

International career
Dewangga debuted in an Indonesia U19 when he was starting against the Philippines U19 in the 2019 AFF U-18 Youth Championship. And brought the U19 team to third place in the championship after winning 5–0 in a match against Myanmar U19.

In October 2021, Dewangga was called up to the Indonesia U23 in a friendly match against Tajikistan and Nepal and also prepared for the 2022 AFC U-23 Asian Cup qualification in Tajikistan by Shin Tae-yong. On 19 October 2021, Dewangga debuted in the U23 team when he came as a starter in a 2–1 win against Tajikistan U23 in a friendly match.

Senior

In November 2021, Indonesian coach, Shin Tae-yong sent Dewangga his first call up to the full national side, for the friendly matches in Turkey against Afghanistan and Myanmar. He made his official international debut on 25 November 2021, against Myanmar in a friendly match in Antalya, Turkey. On 15 December 2021, Dewangga came out as the best player in a 0–0 draw against Vietnam on the third matchday of Group B of the 2020 AFF Championship.

Career statistics

Club

Notes

International

Honours

International 
Indonesia U-19
 AFF U-19 Youth Championship third place: 2019
Indonesia U-23
 Southeast Asian Games  Bronze medal: 2021
Indonesia
 AFF Championship runner-up: 2020

References

External links
 Alfeandra Dewangga at pssi.org
 

2001 births
Living people
Indonesian footballers
People from Semarang
Sportspeople from Central Java
Indonesia youth international footballers
Indonesia international footballers
Liga 1 (Indonesia) players
PSIS Semarang players
Association football defenders
Competitors at the 2021 Southeast Asian Games
Southeast Asian Games bronze medalists for Indonesia
Southeast Asian Games medalists in football